The Music of Nashville: Season 4, Volume 1 is the seventh soundtrack from the American musical drama television series Nashville, created by Academy Award winner Callie Khouri and starring Connie Britton as country music superstar Rayna Jaymes and Hayden Panettiere as Juliette Barnes. The album was released on December 4, 2015, digitally and (exclusively through Target in North America) physically.

The album debuted at No. 170 on the Billboard 200, No. 6 on Soundtrack Albums, selling 5,200 copies in the first week.

Track listing

Charts

References

Television soundtracks
2015 soundtrack albums
Big Machine Records soundtracks
Country music soundtracks
Music of Nashville: Season 4, Volume 1